Quincy Davis may refer to:

Quincy Davis (basketball) (born 1983), American-born Taiwanese basketball player
Quincy Davis (musician) (born 1977), American drummer
Quincy Davis (surfer) (born 1995), American surfer